The Australian state of Queensland requires its residents to register their motor vehicles and display vehicle registration plates.

Issuing authorities 
 Police Traffic Department: 1906-July 1921
 Main Roads Department:1950s–1990
 Queensland Transport:1990–2009
 Department of Transport & Main Roads: 2009–present

General series 
Vehicles (current): 000·GA2

Motorcycles: 000·YA

Large trailers (over 1.02t ATM): 000·UQA

Small trailers (up to 1.02t ATM): GA·0000

 On 29 May 1914 the Queensland Traffic Act was amended so that the Police Commissioner had the discretion to assign an initial identification letter to each traffic district in which the vehicle was registered. For example, plates beginning with A were registered in Brisbane; B in Rockhampton; C in Toowoomba, P in  Hughenden.
 From June 1, 1921 to March 31, 1925 the initial Q12345 were all white on black base. 
 From April 1, 1925 until 1955, the plates were "Q|123-456". The "Q" area was painted black on a white background, while the numbers were painted white on a black background. A dash was placed before the last three digits.

Starting on 1 July 1955, plates were manufactured in the format aaa-nnn with white text on a black base. The block used was NAA·000 to PZZ·999, starting at NAA-000, with the O-series initially skipped and used last.

Once the aaa·nnn format between NAA·000 and PZZ·999 was exhausted, Queensland reversed the order to nnn·aaa, starting 1 July 1977. These plates were issued with green text on a white reflective background and bore the slogan Queensland – Sunshine State. As such Queensland became the second jurisdiction in Australia to issue sloganised plates. This series started at 000·NAA and spanned through to 999·PZZ. After exhausting this initial allocation, in late 1987, Queensland began issuing combinations from 000·AAA onwards.

On 28 September 2001, the last plate with green text was manufactured—999·GKJ.

In October 2001, Premier Peter Beattie announced that the state would be switching to maroon-on-white plates embossed with the slogan Queensland – The Smart State. The Premier stated that idea for the change came from a member of the public. This was to demonstrate the state government's efforts to promote education, research and development within Queensland. Due to backlash from tourism operators and the public, Beattie rescinded his decision on 30 October, instead allowing motorists to select between either the old or new slogans with maroon text. However, it adopted as policy that all government owned motor vehicles, including privately plated vehicles use The Smart State slogan, except where the Premier otherwise agrees. The first of the new maroon plates were manufactured on 14 November 2001. This started at 000·GKK for the Sunshine State plates and 000·HAA for The Smart State versions. The Smart State slogan was allocated the combinations 000·HAA to 999·HFU, 000·HOY to 999·HQQ, 000·HRU to 999·HRU, 000·HUM to 999·HUM, 000·JAA to 999·JDZ, 000·JKA to 999·JKT, 000·KAA to 999·KAZ, 000·KFA to 999·KGK, 000·KOA to 999·KPD, 000·KWS to 999·KXG, 000·LFA to 999·LFU, 000·LOA to 999·LOZ, 000·LZI to 999·LZZ, and 000·MAA to 999·MFM. All others have Sunshine State slogans.

In late May 2010, after 999·MZZ was reached, the series skipped to 000·RAA, due to standard-issue plates in the 000·NAA to 999·PZZ remaining in circulation, and 000·QAA to 999·QZZ combinations being used and reserved for large trailers and government vehicles.

On 22 April 2012, the recently elected Newman Government announced that it would stop manufacturing The Smart State plates as a cost-cutting measure, noting that nine out of 10 customers chose the Sunshine State slogan.

Starting on 19 August 2013, limited edition Queenslander! – 8 in a Row slogan plates starting at 000·UAA were issued to celebrate the recent eighth consecutive State of Origin win for Queensland.

In July 2014, when the combination 999·TZZ was reached, the 000·UAA to 999·UZZ series were skipped, recommencing from 000·VAA. The U-series plates are reserved for large trailers and special applications, such as the limited edition Queenslander! – 8 in a Row plates.

On 1 July 2018, the Queensland Government announced that it was revealed that after general issue 999-ZZZ the following combinations will be issued:

 Commencing in September 2020, new series of three numbers, two letters and one number commenced, eg 123·AB4 
 When that is exhausted it will be four numbers, two letters, eg 123·4AB

On 1 September 2020, new series started from 001·AA2 as 000·AA2 was given away as a prize by the department. "0" and "1" will not be used in the last position in the new series as it would be mistaken with the letter "O" and letter “I” from the previous series.
Skipped combinations: 000·MFN to 999·MPZ and 093·UAG to 999·UAZ (000·UAA to 092·UAG was issued).

General series allocations 

* Note: Registration numbers recorded until 1988 are of those issued by Head Office (including Spring Hill). Registration numbers shown from 1988 are approximate. The requirement for a "dash" (-) before the last three digits was introduced in 1925. From 2003 until 2012 motorists were offered a choice of slogans; 'SUNSHINE STATE" or "SMART STATE". This led to, for example, a number plate 000-HPA with the "SMART STATE" slogan, being issued on the same day as a number plate 000-IGK with the "SUNSHINE STATE" slogan.  

 Motorcycle: 1955 to 1975 NA·000 to QZ·999 in white on black base then reissued from 1973 to 1975. In 1975 it changed to 000·NA and completed the run at 999·QZ in December 1980. It changed back to aa-nnn beginning at AA-000 in green on reflective white. From January 2002, it changed to Maroon on white at UK·000 then the run was completed in October 2006. Since 2006 it is in 000-Aa format commencing at 000·AA and in September 2015, Transport & Main Roads has confirmed that 000·NA to 999·QZ cancelled white on blacks are being reissued in maroon on white before it can move to 000-Ra range. As of December 2017, the embossed QLD legend has been updated in an enlarged QLD state identifier starting at 000-QQ.
 Trailer: Up to 1955 the trailer has a Q/Tnnn-nnn format in white on black base (with QT in reverse B&W). From 1955, the format was from NTA·000 to NTZ·999. In 1963 the blocks were recalled and replaced by two type formats the smaller trailer format from QZ-9999 to OA-0000 in white on black base, changing from 1988 to white on reflective green base from OK onwards. in 1993 the format began at AA-0000 and the 2001 changeover to Maroon on reflective white occurred in the BI-0000 series and now is in the early F series. The standard size format for larger trailers in white on black runs from QVA-000 to QZZ-999 running from 1963 to 1988. In 1988 it switched to green on reflective white starting at 000-QAA then the 2002 change to maroon in the 000-QHP series and now in 000-QZZ range. As of 20 May 2015, 000-UBA was allocated onwards for new issues.

Other vehicles 
  QG Prefix State Government QG·AA00

State Government-owned vehicles' plates have the format QGa·nnn from 1955 to 1980 in white on black base then in an interim arrangement in 1979 allocated QHA until the Bjelke-Petersen government made a clear decision, to issue newer plates from May 1980 using nnn-QGa.

1955 – 1980 – QGA·000
1980 – 1989 – 000·QGA
1989 – 1993 – QGA·000
1993 – 1999 – 000·QGA
1993 – 2002 – QGA·000
2002 – 2007 – 000·QGA
2007 –Current – QG·AA00

Previously, State Government vehicles bear the "Smart State" slogan ("QG", of course, standing for "Queensland Government"). As of October 2012 QG plates have moved to the Sunshine State slogan starting from QG·KA01. Government trailer format in both reverse formats are QZA·QZZ and smaller trailer as QG. They are no longer issued. Queensland Fire and Emergency Services fire equipment have plates in the series nnnn·QF, QF being an abbreviation of Queensland Fire and nnnn being the appliance's fleet number, padded to 4 digits where necessary.

Between 1955 and 1991 ambulance vehicles in Queensland were registered with plates in the series QAV·000 to QAY·199.

There are many special blocks of plates allocated to different vehicles with specific uses:
 Tnn·nnn for taxis- Previously in white on green base both non reflective and reflective until from 1961 to 2002. In current maroon on reflective white.
 nnnnCn for limited-use vehicles (mainly roadworks equipment and golf buggies). These plates began at C·00001. When C·99999 was reached it was followed by 00000·C. In 2021 once 99999·C was reached, 0000·C0 was introduced with the issuing sequence of 9999·C0 being followed by 0000·C1.
 L·nnnnn for limousines – QUEENSLAND LIMOUSINE embossed legend
 SL·00·BC for Special Purpose limousines – QUEENSLAND LIMOUSINE embossed legend
 F·nnnnn or 1A·nnn for farm vehicles
 S·nnnnn for special interest or historical vehicles (registered concessionally if they are not to be used as regular transport)
 CC·000 for consular staff vehicles. CONSULAR CORPS screened legend, which has since been amended to show QLD-CONSULAR CORPS.
 DA·000 QLD-DEALER TRADE It is a new Dealer Trade plate in a bike rack size introduced in October 2015 replacing the two lined square QLD - Limited Use that has a top label space, introduced in January 2000 starting in green then later in maroon. From 1976 to 1999 the format was in annual colours as D92 1000 being the year after the D prefix. Between 1962 and 1976 dealers were in D1-234 and E1-234 blocks. 1958 to 1962 was in N-123 and P-123 on a square base with large QLD embossing at top. Prior to 1958 it has QD-1234 blocks.

Personalised plates 

PPQ – Personalised Plates Queensland is a personalised plate product of the Queensland Transport and Main Roads Department and they have a dedicated website in use.

Queensland motorists have a choice of nearly 100 different types of personalised plates. Personalised plates are very popular amongst Queenslanders and often sell for a premium via classifieds or various online portals such as eBay.

In addition, PPQ offers customers 'retro' plates, which are essentially general-issue plates that may be retained if customers change vehicles. As vintage general issue 'Q' plates, white-on-black plates and green-on-white plates will eventually attract a relatively high price among classic car collectors and restorers, PPQ has made retro plates essentially non-transferable; that is, they may be attached to many different vehicles, but the listed owner(s) must stay the same with each registration and can only be transferred to direct relations.

Formats used are nn-aaa, aaa-nn, nnn-aaa or aaa-nnn, and later in mixed formats i.e. A1BT23 Qaa-nnZ and Qaa-nnY (for Euro combinations) and custom combinations as cccccc. 7-letter combinations are auctioned off from time to time and for limited periods between 2007 and 2009, PPQ made 7-letter combinations available for sale online.

 Prior to 1998 Main Roads Department and later Transport Queensland commenced selling graphic plates from 1979 and expanded into current graphics Qld range during 1993.
 PPQ established in 1998
 September 2010 – PPQ released 7 letter/number combinations that were not already issued for a limited period of 7 days at the fixed price of $2995 but by 2012 it is now permanent.
 November 2010 – PPQ launched the Q Signature Series plates: Qaann
 March 2011 – PPQ launched the NRL footy plates range covering all of these NRL teams and incorporates Qld based NRL teams.

 October 2012 – PPQ launched the A Plate Series: Aaaaaa retailed from $2,500. Now updated in 2017 to a plain all white on black with square border on A character.
 June 2018 – Zodiac plates have been dropped from sale. Last day was 30 June 2018.
 November 2018 – Some of NRL plates have had team colours changed such as Brisbane Broncos.
 February 2019 – Emoji plates were introduced and later expanded to other emojis.
 8 October 2019 – Customised slogan coloured plates launched.
 February 2020 – JDM (Japanese Domestic Market) plates introduced, similar style as NSW does.

Discontinued plates 
 Tractor series: A1·999 Issued from the 1950s then the final colour shown as M1·000 until replaced in the 1990s by A·0000. Replaced by the current tractor series.
 P annual plates series: P1·0000 P yearly permit plates was issued in the 1990s, but was discontinued.
 Hire car series: PVH·000 Issued from the 1960s, then the final colour shown from 1984 000·PVH until replaced by the current L-series in 1993.
 PPQ plate products: discontinued in 2014 were The Simpsons and Hello Kitty as the licence to use these characters was not renewed. Zodiac Plates 30 Jun 2018.

References

External links 
Knight, H. List of Motor Owners in Queensland: names, addresses, make of cars alphabetically arranged together with List of Motor Garages in Queensland,1923 [list of Queensland Q Plates and their owners]. State Library of Queensland

Freeman, Jennifer. New acquisition - List of Motor Owners in Queensland, John Oxley Library, State Library of Queensland [blog post, 9 October 2014]

Vehicle registration plates of Australia
Transport in Queensland
Queensland transport-related lists